This is a list of election results for the Electoral district of Eyre in South Australian elections.

Members for Eyre

Election results

Elections in the 1990s

Elections in the 1980s

Elections in the 1970s

Elections in the 1960s

Elections in the 1950s

 Preferences were not distributed.

Elections in the 1940s

Elections in the 1930s

Preferences were not distributed.

References

South Australian state electoral results by district